Jean-François-Joseph Lecointe (1783–1858) was official architect to king Charles X of France.  He worked in direct collaboration with Jacques Ignace Hittorff from 1819 to 1830, in particular on the Théâtre de l'Ambigu-Comique and the organisation of grand royal ceremonies and the elaborate temporary structures these required.  He is buried at the Notre-Dame cemetery in Versailles.

Sources 
 http://p.landru.free.fr/chapdelaine/article.php3?id_article=387

People from Abbeville
1783 births
1858 deaths
19th-century French architects